"Dulce" (Sweet) is a pop song recorded by Chilean singer and song-writer Francisca Valenzuela and this song is the second single and also the more successful single released from her first solo debut studio album, Muérdete La Lengua, which was released in Chile on December 28, 2006.

Song information
The song was written during 2005 by Valenzuela, and produced by Mauricio Durán and Francisco Durán, members of Chilean Rock band Los Bunkers. The song was released on December 28, 2006 on the radio. Subsequently, on March 12, 2007, it was made available for Digital Download.

Music video

The official music video for the song "Dulce" was premiered on Via X on January 30, 2007 with high popularity in the Chilean music channels, later on March 12, 2007 was premiered for MTV Latin America, the same day of the Digital release of the single. The music video was directed by Francisca García and in the simple music video shows to Francisca playing a piano in front a black screen with candies over the piano.

Track listing
Promo Single
 "Dulce" (Radio Version) – 3:20
 "Dulce" (Album Version) – 3:28

Digital Download Single
 "Dulce" (Album Version) – 3:28

Release history

References

External links
 
 Official Music website
 Official MySpace
 Official Blog

2006 singles
Francisca Valenzuela songs
Songs written by Francisca Valenzuela
2006 songs